The 1994 Asian Acrobatic Gymnastics Championships were the second edition of the Asian Acrobatic Gymnastics Championships, and were held in Shenzhen, China, in April 1994.

Medal summary

References

A
Asian Gymnastics Championships
International gymnastics competitions hosted by China